Paul C. Gordon Jr. (April 8, 1927 – November 2, 2002) was an American professional basketball player. He participated in four games for the Baltimore Bullets of the National Basketball Association (NBA) during the 1949–50 season. He attended University of Notre Dame. Gordon played for the Lancaster Rockets of the Eastern Professional Basketball League (EPBL) and was a two-time All-EPBL Second Team selection.

NBA career statistics

Regular season

References

External links

1927 births
2002 deaths
American men's basketball players
Baltimore Bullets (1944–1954) draft picks
Baltimore Bullets (1944–1954) players
Basketball players from Baltimore
Forwards (basketball)
Notre Dame Fighting Irish men's basketball players